Koka and Vikoka are figures from Hindu text, twin generals who will aid the demon Kali in his battle against Kalki, the 10th and final avatar of the god Vishnu, whose coming will herald the end of the age. The story is told in the Kalki Purana.

The prophecy of Kalki and his battle with Kali appears in the Kalki Purana, a collection of predictions concerning when, where and why Kalki will manifest himself and what he will do. According to Hindu cosmology the world will experience four long ages, or yugas, of which the Kali Yuga is the last in a cycle. The Kali Yuga began in 3102 BCE and has around 4,270 centuries remaining. Kali, the demon-king of the Kali Yuga, will be assisted by his generals, the twin brothers Koka and Vikoka, who will threaten to defeat Kalki by raising themselves from the dead, faster than he can kill them. The god Brahma eventually appears to Kalki and reveals to him that no earthly or celestial weapon can kill the brothers if they are allowed to hold on to one another; the only way Kalki can defeat them is to separate and attack them both simultaneously. Kalki then forces himself between the two and lands crushing blows to each demon’s temple at the same time. They both die, this time forever.

The Kalki Purana states Koka and Vikoka in their previous births were the grandsons of Shakuni and sons of Vrikasura, who are not to be confused with the Shakuni and Vrikasura from the Mahabharata - former are father and son, whereas the latter are unrelated. The etymology of Koka's name is obscure,  and the Monier-Williams Sanskrit dictionary gives no ready definition; Vikoka's name is formed by adding Vi-, used to form names from other names, to "Koka".

References

Citations

Publications

Source
Kalki Purana 

Demons in Hinduism
Kali (demon)